Alassa is a village in the Limassol District of Cyprus, north of the Kouris Dam, on the main road from Limassol to Kakopetria.

Excavations at Alassa by Cypriot archaeologists in the early 1980s unearthed the ruins of a Bronze Age city. Among other findings were the remains of a palace, suggesting that the site once had a much greater importance as a local trading center. Whether Alassa was the capital of the ancient kingdom known as Alashiya remains a question of debate. The archaeologist Claude Schaeffer has made certain claims in this regard.

Roman villas have also been found there, a mosaic floor depicting Aphrodite and Eros from one of which is in the Limassol museum.

Alassa has been developed in modern times as a park-like tourist centre.

References

Archaeological sites in Cyprus
Communities in Limassol District